Bob Marley and the Wailers were a Jamaican reggae band created by Bob Marley. The band formed when self-taught musician Hubert Winston McIntosh (Peter Tosh) met Neville Livingston (Bunny Wailer), and Robert Nesta Marley (Bob Marley) in 1963 and taught them how to play guitar, keyboards, and percussion. By late 1963 Junior Braithwaite, Beverley Kelso, and Cherry Smith had joined the Wailers. After Peter Tosh and Bunny Wailer left the band in 1974, Bob Marley began touring with new band members. His new backing band included brothers Carlton Barrett and Aston "Family Man" Barrett on drums and bass respectively, Junior Marvin and Al Anderson on lead guitar, Tyrone Downie and Earl "Wya" Lindo on keyboards, and Alvin "Seeco" Patterson on percussion. The "I Threes", consisting of Judy Mowatt, Marcia Griffiths, and Marley's wife, Rita, provided backing vocals.

Full members
Bob Marley
Active: 1963–1981
Instruments: vocals, rhythm guitar, acoustic guitar, percussion
Release contributions: all releases

Peter Tosh
Active: 1963–1974
Instruments: vocals, lead guitar, piano, organ
Release contributions: all releases from The Wailing Wailers (1965) until Burnin' (1973)

Bunny Wailer 
Active: 1963–1974
Instruments: vocals, congas, bongos
Release contributions: all releases from The Wailing Wailers (1965) until Burnin (1973)

Junior Braithwaite 
Active: 1963–1964
Instruments: vocals
Release contributions: The Wailing Wailers (1965)

Cherry Smith 
Active: 1963–1964, 1965–1966
Instruments: backing vocals
Release contributions: The Wailing Wailers (1965)

Beverley Kelso 
Active: 1964–1965
Instruments: backing vocals
Release contributions: The Wailing Wailers (1965)

Constantine Walker 
Active: 1966
Instruments: backing vocals
Release contributions: none

Aston Barrett
Active: 1970–1981
Instruments: bass guitar, guitar, percussion, keyboards, piano
Release contributions: all releases from Soul Rebels (1970) until Confrontation (1983)

Carlton Barrett 
Active: 1970–1981
Instruments: drums, percussion
Release contributions: all releases from Soul Rebels (1970) until Confrontation (1983)

Earl Lindo
Active: 1973, 1978–1981
Instruments: keyboards, clavinet, organ, percussion, backing vocals
Release contributions: Burnin''' (1973), Survival (1979), Uprising (1980) and Confrontation (1983)

Tyrone Downie 
Active: 1974–1981
Instruments: organ, keyboards, bass guitar, percussion, backing vocals
Release contributions: Catch a Fire (1973) and all releases from Rastaman Vibration (1976) until Confrontation (1983)

Rita Marley 
Active: 1974–1981
Instruments: backing vocals
Release contributions: Catch a Fire (1973) and all releases from Natty Dread (1974) until Confrontation (1983)

Marcia Griffiths
Active: 1974–1981
Instruments: backing vocals
Release contributions: Catch a Fire (1973) and all releases from Natty Dread (1974) until Confrontation (1983)

Judy Mowatt 
Active: 1974–1981
Instruments: backing vocals
Release contributions: all releases from Natty Dread (1974) until Confrontation (1983)

Al Anderson
Active: 1974–1975, 1978-1981
Instruments: lead guitar, rhythm guitar
Release contributions: Natty Dread (1974), Rastaman Vibration (1976), Survival (1979), Uprising (1980)

Alvin Patterson
Active: 1975–1981
Instruments: percussion
Release contributions: Catch a Fire (1973), Burnin (1973), Rastaman Vibration (1976), Exodus (1977), Kaya (1978), Uprising (1980) and Confrontation (1983)

Earl "Chinna" Smith
Active: 1975-1976
Instruments: lead guitar, rhythm guitar, percussion
Release contributions: Rastaman Vibration (1976)

Donald Kinsey
Active: 1975-1976
Instruments: lead guitar
Release contributions: Rastaman Vibration (1976)

Junior Marvin 
Active: 1977–1981
Instruments: lead guitar, backing vocals
Release contributions: all releases from Exodus (1977) until Confrontation (1983)

Touring members
Joe Higgs 
Active: 1973
Instruments: vocals, percussion

Lee Jaffe
Active: 1974–1975
Instruments: harmonica

Session musicians
Hugh Malcolm 
Active: 1967–1972
Instruments: drums, percussion
Release contributions:

Alva "Reggie" Lewis
Instruments: guitar
Release contributions: Soul Rebels (1970) and Soul Revolution (1971)

Glen Adams
Instruments: keyboard
Release contributions: Soul Rebels (1970) and Soul Revolution (1971)

Robbie Shakespeare 
Instruments: bass guitar
Release contributions: Catch a Fire (1973)

Wayne Perkins 
Instruments: lead guitar
Release contributions: Catch a Fire (1973)

John "Rabbit" Bundrick 
Instruments: synthesizer, clavinet, organ
Release contributions: Catch a Fire (1973)

Chris Karen 
Instruments: percussion
Release contributions: Catch a Fire (1973)

Winston Wright 
Instruments: percussion
Release contributions: Catch a Fire (1973)

Bernard "Touter" Harvey
Instruments: piano, organ
Release contributions: Natty Dread (1974)

Nathaniel Ian Wynter aka Natty Wailer
Instruments: keyboards
Release contributions: Rastaman Vibration (1976), Exodus (1977)

Vin Gordon
Instruments: saxophone
Release contributions: Kaya (1978)

Glen Da Costa
Instruments: trumpet, saxophone
Release contributions: Kaya (1978), Confrontation (1983)

David Madden
Instruments: trumpet
Release contributions: Kaya (1978), Confrontation (1983)

Mikey "Boo" Richards
Instruments: drums
Release contributions: Survival (1979)

Val Douglas
Instruments: bass
Release contributions: Survival (1979)

Carlton "Santa" Davis
Instruments: drums
Release contributions: Confrontation (1983)

Devon Evans
Instruments: percussion
Release contributions: Confrontation (1983)

Ronald "Nambo" Robinson
Instruments: trombone
Release contributions: Confrontation'' (1983)

Line-ups

Timeline

References

External links
 

 
Bob Marley and the Wailers